The 2021 National Camogie League, known for sponsorship reasons as the Littlewoods Ireland Camogie Leagues, took place in Ireland in summer 2021. It was won by Kilkenny.

Format

League structure
The 2021 National Camogie League consists of four divisions: 
9 in Division 1, divided into three groups of 3 teams
14 in Division 2, divided into four groups of 3 or 4 teams
8 in Division 3, divided into two groups of 4 teams
8 in Division 4, divided into two groups of 4 teams

Each team plays every other team in its group once. 3 points are awarded for a win and 1 for a draw.

If two teams are level on points, the tie-break is:
 winners of the head-to-head game are ranked ahead
 if the head-to-head match was a draw, ranking is determined by the points difference (i.e. total scored minus total conceded in all games)
 if the points difference is equal, ranking is determined by the total scored

If three or more teams are level on league points, rankings are determined solely by points difference.

Finals 

In Division 1, two group winners (chosen randomly) advance to the semi-finals, while one group winner and the three group runners-up play in the quarter-finals.

In Division 2, the top two teams in each group advance to the quarter-finals.

In Division 3, the top two teams in each group advance to the semi-finals.

In Division 4, the top two teams in each group advance to the semi-finals.

Relegation
In Division 1, the 3 third-placed teams play a relegation semi-final and relegation final, with the loser relegated.

In Division 2, the last-placed team in each group plays in the relegation semi-finals, with the losers going into the relegation final, with the losers relegated.

In Division 3, the 2 fourth-placed teams play a relegation playoff, with the losers relegated.

Fixtures and results

Division 1
Group games were played on 15, 22 and 29 May 2021.

Group 1

Group 2

Group 3

Relegation playoffs

Finals

References

External links
Link on camogie.ie

League
National Camogie League seasons